New Albany is a community in the Canadian province of Nova Scotia, located in Annapolis County. It was probably named after Albany, New York.

References

Communities in Annapolis County, Nova Scotia